A standing proxy is one that exists until revoked. This is in contrast to a proxy that is designated for a temporary or one-time use. A special proxy takes priority over a standing proxy, and the standing proxy is temporarily suspended when the principal or his special proxy are present. As U.S. Securities and Exchange Commission (SEC) Info notes:

References

Corporate governance